Winters Mill High School is a high school in Westminster, Maryland, United States that was established in 2002.

Demographics 
The demographic breakdown of the 1,084 students enrolled in 2015-2016 was:
Male - 51.0%
Female - 49.0%
Native American/Alaskan Native - 0.3%
Asian/Pacific islanders - 2.9%
Black - 7.9%
Hispanic - 8.3%
White - 78.5%
Multiracial - 2.1%
Other - 4.8%

23.6% of the students were eligible for free or reduced-cost lunch. In 2015–2016, Winters Mill was a Title I school.

References

External links 
 

Public high schools in Maryland
Carroll County Public Schools (Maryland)
Westminster, Maryland
Educational institutions established in 2002
2002 establishments in Maryland